The royal tetra (Inpaichthys kerri) is a species of characin endemic to Brazil, where it is found in tributaries of the Aripuanã River. It is the sole member of its genus.

The fish was named in honor of Warwick Estevam Kerr (1922-2018), a Brazilian agricultural engineer, geneticist, entomologist, and director of INPA the acronym for Instituto Nacional de Pesquisas da Amazônia, whose field station in Núcleo Aripuanã, Mato Grosso, Brazil, is near the area where the type was found.

Ecology
Inpaichthys kerri was discovered in sunny and moving waters of the forested Queimada river system, a tributary of the Aripuanã River. In its natural habitat it lives in very soft and slightly acidic waters with a pH between 6.0 and 6.8.  I. kerri is a very active and bold species and has been found schooling with another undescribed species (similar to Hyphessobrycon cachimbensis), and is generally less abundant than the latter, in the ratio 1/200 or less, although it can be quite abundant in some spots. It feeds mainly on insects that fell on the water surface.

In captivity
It is kept as an aquarium fish where it is sold under the additional common names blue emperor tetra, purple emperor tetra, black emperor tetra, or regal tetra (not to be confused with Nematobrycon palmeri with similar appearance and common names). I. kerri requires similar-sized schooling fish that are not overly aggressive, as this species is prone to diseases when stressed in captivity.

References
 

Characidae
Monotypic fish genera
Fish of South America
Fish of Brazil
Endemic fauna of Brazil
Fish described in 1977
Taxa named by Jacques Géry
Taxa named by Wolfgang Johannes Junk